Elections to Calderdale Metropolitan Borough Council were held on 1 May 2003.  One third of the council was up for election and the council stayed under no overall control. The total turnout of the election was 34.44% (47,601 voters of an electorate of 138,228). The winning candidate(s) in each ward is highlighted in bold.

After the election, the composition of the council was
Conservative 25
Liberal Democrat 16
Labour 10
British National 2
Independent 1

Ward results

Brighouse ward

Calder Valley ward

Elland ward

Greetland and Stainland ward

Hipperholme and Lightcliffe ward

Illingworth ward

Luddendenfoot ward

Mixenden ward

Northowram and Shelf ward

Ovenden ward

Rastrick ward

Ryburn ward

Skircoat ward

Sowerby Bridge ward

St John's ward

Todmorden ward

Town ward

Warley ward

By-elections between 2003 and 2004

Mixenden ward, 2003

References

2003
2003 English local elections
2000s in West Yorkshire